"You Carved Your Name" is a song by American-Swedish rapper Swingfly featuring vocals by Swedish singer Helena Gutarra. The song was released in Sweden as a digital download on 20 February 2016, and was written by Joakim Åhlund and Andreas Kleerup. It took part in Melodifestivalen 2016, and placed sixth in the third semi-final.

Track listing

Chart performance

Weekly charts

Release history

References

2015 songs
2016 singles
Melodifestivalen songs of 2016
Swingfly songs
English-language Swedish songs
Songs written by Kleerup
Warner Music Group singles
Songs written by Joakim Åhlund